District and Circle is a poetry collection by Seamus Heaney, who received the 1995 Nobel Prize in Literature. It was published in 2006 and won the 2006 T. S. Eliot Prize, the most prestigious poetry award in the UK. The collection also won the Irish Times "Poetry Now Award".

Reporting on the Eliot Prize, the BBC commented in 2007, "The award is yet more confirmation, as if it was needed, of Heaney's reputation as, arguably, the English language's greatest living bard, whom author Malcolm Bradbury once described as 'the poet of poets'." In 2013, Heaney's volumes made up two-thirds of the sales of living poets in Britain.

The poet dedicated District and Circle to the Canadian professor of Irish Studies Ann Saddlemyer. Heaney has been recorded reading this collection on the Seamus Heaney Collected Poems album.

Contents

 The Turnip-Snedder
 Shiver
 Polish Sleepers
 Anahorish 1944
 To Mick Joyce in Heaven
 The Aerodrome
 Anything Can Happen
 Helmet
 Out of Shot
 Rilke: After the Fire
 District and Circle
 To George Seferis in the Underworld
 Wordsworth's Skates
 The Harrow-Pin
 Poet to Blacksmith
 Midnight Anvil
 Súgán
 Senior Infants 1. The Sally Rod
 Senior Infants 2. A Chow
 Senior Infants 3. One Christmas Day in the Morning
 The Nod
 A Clip
 Edward Thomas on the Lagans Road
 Found Prose 1. The Lagans Road
 Found Prose 2. Tall Dames
 Found Prose 3. Boarders
 The Lift
 Nonce Words
 Stern
 Out of this World 1. 'Like Everybody Else...'
 Out of this World 2. Brancardier
 Out of this World 3. Saw Music
 In Iowa
 Höfn
 On the Spot
 Tollund Man in Springtime
 Moyulla
 Planting the Alder
 Tate's Avenue
 A Hagging Match
 Fiddleheads
 To Pablo Neruda in Tamlaghtduff
 Home Help 1. Helping Sarah
 Home Help 2. Chairing Mary
 Rilke: The Apple Orchard
 Quitting Time
 Home Fires 1. A Scuttle for Dorothy Wordsworth
 Home Fires 2. A Stove Lid for W.H. Auden
 The Birch Gove
 Cavafy: 'The Rest I'll Speak of to the Ones Below in Hades’
 In a Loaning
 The Blackbird of Glanmore

Critical reception

The poetry in District and Circle has been widely and positively reviewed by the critics. In the Observer Review Andrew Motion wrote, "Due in large part to the richness of his language, and also to the undiminished freshness of his response to time-honoured things, its consolidations have the feel of celebrations. The book does not merely dig in, but digs deep." The poet and critic Stephanie Burt also praised the book, writing that "anyone who isn’t  impressed isn’t listening." Brad Leithauser, in The New York Times, praised Heaney for "saying something extraordinary while, line by line, conveying a sense that this is something an ordinary person might actually say".

The critic Peter McDonald said "The book contains marvellous prose-poems on the peopled landscapes of his schooldays, along with sonnets - seemingly effortless in their sheer fluency, but memorably tough and intent". Stephen Knight wrote that District and Circle was not "as immediate as his earlier work," but he still considered the book to be successful on its own terms, characterizing it as "a late flowering."

Notes

References

External links
Seamus Heaney on NobelPrize.org

2006 poetry books
Irish poetry collections
London Underground in popular culture
Poetry by Seamus Heaney
Faber and Faber books
T. S. Eliot Prize-winning works